Ernst Mühlethaler (17 April 1922 – 2012) was a Swiss sprinter. He competed in the men's 200 metres at the 1952 Summer Olympics.

References

1922 births
2012 deaths
Athletes (track and field) at the 1952 Summer Olympics
Swiss male sprinters
Olympic athletes of Switzerland
Place of birth missing